The Grammy Award for Best Score Soundtrack for Video Games and Other Interactive Media was first presented at the 65th Annual Grammy Awards held in February 2023. The award was introduced to recognize the impact of music specifically written for video games and other interactive media. This is a sister category to the Grammy Award for Best Score Soundtrack for Visual Media, which previously honored scores written for film, television and video games, though Journey in 2013 was the only game ever nominated.

Criteria 
Albums that are eligible for this award must predominantly contain scores specifically written for, or as a companion to, current video games or other interactive media.

The award goes to the original composer(s) of the score.

Background 
The Grammy Award for Best Score Soundtrack for Video Games and Other Interactive Media was announced on June 9, 2022 alongside four additional new categories that would be presented for the first time at the 65th Annual Grammy Awards. Of the category, Recording Academy CEO Harvey Mason Jr. stated "We're so excited to honour these diverse communities of music creators through the newly established awards and amendments, and to continue cultivating an environment that inspires change, progress and collaboration. The Academy's top priority is to effectively represent the music people that we serve, and each year, that entails listening to our members and ensuring our rules and guidelines reflect our ever-evolving industry."

Prior to the creation of this category, only three video games had ever been nominated at the Grammy Awards and many composers and studios had been campaigning for the Recording Academy to recognize the medium for some time. The first piece of music from a video game ever to be nominated for and win a Grammy in any category was "Baba Yetu", a song arranged by Christopher Tin for Civilization IV which won Best Instrumental Arrangement Accompanying Vocalist(s) at the 53rd Annual Grammy Awards. Following this, composer Austin Wintory's score for Journey was nominated for the Grammy Award for Best Score Soundtrack for Visual Media in 2013 and in 2022, Charlie Rosen and Jake Silverman won the Grammy Award for Best Arrangement, Instrumental or A Cappella for their cover of "Meta Knight's Revenge" from Kirby Super Star.

Winners and nominees

References 

Grammy Award categories
Awards established in 2023
Video game music events